Yugo Kato (加藤有吾, born 2 September 1999) is a Japanese kickboxer and muay thai fighter, currently competing in the super bantamweight divisions of Battle of Muaythai and No Kick No Life.

As of September 2021, he is the #10 ranked flyweight kickboxer in the world, according to Combat Press.

Muay Thai career

Early career
Kato made his muay thai and professional debut against Masa Bravely at M-ONE 2016 3rd on 25 September 2016. He won the fight by unanimous decision.

Kato was scheduled to face Ryuto Matsumoto at BOM13-The Battle Of Muay Thai 13- on 4 December 2016. He won the fight by unanimous decision.

Kato was scheduled to face Hiiragito at M-ONE 2017 1st on 20 March 2017. He lost the fight by split decision, with two judges awarding Hiiragito a 30-29 and 29-28 scorecard, while the third judge scored it 29-28 for Kato.

Kato was scheduled to face Shuto Sato at Road To KNOCK OUT.1 on 10 May 2017. He won the fight by a first-round technical knockout.

Kato was scheduled to face Maiki Flyskygym at The Battle Of Muay Thai 19 on 14 October 2018. He won the fight by unanimous decision, with scores of 29–28, 29-28 and 30–27.

Kato was scheduled to face Masaki Takeuchi at ROAD TO KNOCK OUT Vol. 3 on 16 January 2019. Takeuchi won the fight by a second-round technical knockout, after the ringside doctor stopped the fight due to a cut on Kato's eyelid. Kato was the more successful fighter in the first round, having knocked Takeuchi down with a left hook.

Kato was scheduled to face Akihiko at The Battle Of Muay Thai Season 2 vol.2 on 1 June 2019. He won the fight by a second-round technical knockout.

Kato was scheduled to face Suda456 at Pancrase & TRIBE TOKYO M.M.A Road to ONE Century, a Pancrase and ONE Championship cross-promotional event, on 1 September 2019. He won the fight by a second-round knockout.

WMC Japan Super Bantamweight champion
Kato was scheduled to challenge the reigning WMC Japan Super Bantamweight champion Maiki Flyskygym at The Battle Of Muay Thai Season II vol.6 Part 1 on 7 December 2019. The fight was a rematch of their 14 October 2018 meeting, which Kato won by unanimous decision. He was once again victorious, as he won by majority decision.

Kato was scheduled to face Yutto at The Battle Of Muay Thai Season 2 vol.7 Part 2 on 9 February 2020. He won the fight by a second-round knockout.

Kato made the first defense of his WMC Japan title against the WMC Featherweight champion David Chibana at BOM WAVE 01 on 28 June 2020. He won the fight by unanimous decision, with scores of 50–48, 50–48 and 49–48.

Kato was scheduled to face MASAKING at NO KICK NO LIFE ~New Chapter~ on 29 October 2020. He won the fight by a first-round knockout, stopping MASAKING with a left hook at the 1:28 minute mark.

Kato was scheduled to make the second defense of his WMC Japan title against Dynamite Kakizaki at The Battle Of MuayThai -ouroboros 2021- on 26 September 2021. He won the fight by a second-round knockout.

Kickboxing career
Kato was scheduled to face Kaewpayak Y'ZD Gym at NKB Fighting Spirit Series Vol.3 on 16 June 2018. He won the fight by a second-round knockout.

Kato was scheduled to face Ryohei Tanaka at KICK ORIGIN on 4 August 2019. He won the fight by unanimous decision, with scores of 30–28, 30-28 and 30–29.

Kato was scheduled to participate in a Japan Kickboxing Innovation Super Bantamweight tournament, held at Japan Kickboxing Innovation 7th Okayama Gym Certification on 16 January 2021. He won the semifinal match against Yuki Motoyama by a first-round technical knockout. He advanced to the tournament finals, where he faced Issei Saenchai Gym. Kato beat Issei by a wide unanimous decision, with scores of 30–24, 30-24 and 30–25.

Kato was scheduled to face Keisuke Miyamoto at NO KICK NO LIFE New Chapter -Ungai Soten- on 24 February 2021. He lost the fight by majority decision, with scores of 30–29, 29-29 and 29–28.

Kato was scheduled to face Tsubasa at NO KICK NO LIFE on 22 July 2021. He won the fight by unanimous decision. 

Kato was scheduled to face Keisuke Miyamoto at a NO KICK NO LIFE held on 9 January 2022. He won the fight by majority decision.

Kato was booked to face Issei SaenchaiGym at Japan Kickboxing Innovation Okayama Gym Show 8 on March 13, 2022. He won the fight by a third-round knockout.

Kato was scheduled to face Koki Osaki at the May 28, 2022, NO KICK NO LIFE event. He lost the fight by technical knockout, as the fight was stopped in the fifth round on the advice of the ringside physician.

Kato was booked to face Shoma at RISE World Series Osaka 2022 on August 21, 2022. He won the fight by unanimous decision.

Kato faced Ryunosuke Omori at RISE 163 on December 10, 2022. He won the fight by majority decision, with two scorecards of 30–29 and 29–28 and one scorecard of 29–29.

Kato faced Yuki Kyotani at RISE 166 -RISE 20th Memorial event- on February 23, 2023.

Championships and accomplishments
 2019 WMC Japan Super Bantamweight (-55 kg) Championship
 2021 Japan Kickboxing Innovation -55 kg Tournament Winner

Fight record

|-  style="background:#cfc;"
| 2023-02-23 || Win||align=left| Yuki Kyotani || RISE 166 -RISE 20th Memorial event-|| Tokyo, Japan || KO (Left straight) || 2 ||2:29
|-
|-  style="background:#cfc;"
| 2022-12-10|| Win ||align=left| Ryunosuke Omori || RISE 163 || Tokyo, Japan || Decision (Majority) || 3 || 3:00
|-  style="text-align:center; background:#cfc"
| 2022-08-21 ||Win||align=left| Shoma || RISE World Series Osaka 2022 || Osaka, Japan || Decision (Unanimous) ||3 ||3:00
|-  style="text-align:center; background:#fbb"
| 2022-05-28|| Loss||align=left| Koki Osaki || NO KICK NO LIFE || Tokyo, Japan ||  TKO (Doctor stoppage) ||5 ||2:20
|-  style="text-align:center; background:#cfc;"
| 2022-03-13|| Win || align=left| Issei SaenchaiGym|| Japan Kickboxing Innovation Okayama Gym Show 8|| Okayama, Japan || KO (Jumping knee) || 3 || 2:42

|-  style="text-align:center; background:#cfc;"
| 2022-01-09|| Win || align=left| Keisuke Miyamoto||  NO KICK NO LIFE || Tokyo, Japan || Decision (Majority)|| 5||3:00

|-  style="background:#cfc;"
| 2021-09-26 || Win ||align=left| Dynamite Kakizaki || The Battle Of MuayThai -ouroboros 2021- || Ōta, Tokyo, Japan || KO (Right Hook)|| 2 ||1:32
|-
|-  style="background:#cfc;"
| 2021-07-22 || Win ||align=left| Tsubasa || NO KICK NO LIFE || Kōtō, Japan || Decision (Unanimous) || 3 ||3:00
|-
|-  style="background:#fbb;"
| 2021-02-24 || Loss||align=left| Keisuke Miyamoto || NO KICK NO LIFE New Chapter -Ungai Soten- || Shibuya, Japan || Decision (Majority) || 3 ||3:00
|-
|-  style="background:#cfc;"
| 2021-01-16 || Win ||align=left| Issei Saenchai Gym || Japan Kickboxing Innovation 7th Okayama Gym Certification, Tournament Final || Okayama, Japan || Decision (Unanimous) || 3 || 3:00
|-
! style=background:white colspan=9 |
|-
|-  style="background:#cfc;"
| 2021-01-16 || Win ||align=left| Yuki Motoyama || Japan Kickboxing Innovation 7th Okayama Gym Certification, Tournament Semifinal || Okayama, Japan || TKO (Three knockdowns) || 1 || 2:11
|-
|-  style="background:#cfc;"
| 2020-10-29 || Win ||align=left| MASAKING || NO KICK NO LIFE ~New Chapter~ || Tokyo, Japan || KO (Left hook) || 1 || 1:28
|-
|-  style="background:#cfc;"
| 2020-06-28 || Win ||align=left| David Chibana || BOM WAVE 01 || Yokohama, Japan || Decision (Unanimous) || 5 || 3:00
|-
! style=background:white colspan=9 |
|-
|-  style="background:#cfc;"
| 2020-02-09 || Win ||align=left| Yutto || The Battle Of Muay Thai Season 2 vol.7 Part 2 || Shinjuku, Japan || TKO || 2 || 1:54
|-
|-  style="background:#cfc;"
| 2019-12-07 || Win ||align=left| Maiki Flyskygym || The Battle Of Muay Thai Season II vol.6 Part 1 || Tokyo, Japan || Decision (Majority) || 5 || 3:00
|-
! style=background:white colspan=9 |
|-
|-  style="background:#cfc;"
| 2019-09-01 || Win ||align=left| Suda456 || Pancrase&TRIBE TOKYO M.M.A Road to ONE Century || Tokyo, Japan || KO (Left straight) || 2 || 1:16
|-
|-  style="background:#cfc;"
| 2019-08-04 || Win ||align=left| Ryohei Tanaka || KICK ORIGIN || Bunkyō, Japan || Decision (Unanimous) || 3 || 3:00
|-
|-  style="background:#cfc;"
| 2019-06-01 || Win ||align=left| Akihiko || The Battle Of Muay Thai Season 2 vol.2 || Yokohama, Japan || TKO (Punches) || 2 || 2:07
|-
|-  style="background:#fbb;"
| 2019-01-16 || Loss ||align=left| Masaki Takeuchi || ROAD TO KNOCK OUT Vol. 3 || Shibuya, Japan || TKO (Doctor stoppage) || 2 || 1:31
|-
|-  style="background:#cfc;"
| 2018-10-14 || Win  ||align=left| Maiki Flyskygym || The Battle Of Muay Thai 19 || Shinjuku, Japan || Decision (Unanimous) || 3 || 3:00
|-
|-  style="background:#cfc;"
| 2018-06-16 || Win ||align=left| Kaewpayak Y'ZD Gym  || NKB Fighting Spirit Series Vol.3 || Bunkyō, Japan || KO || 2 || 0:35
|-
|-  style="background:#fbb;"
| 2017-06-11 || Loss ||align=left| Aido Suenaga || BOUT 27 || Sapporo, Japan || KO  || 1 || 
|-
|-  style="background:#cfc;"
| 2017-05-10 || Win ||align=left| Shuto Sato || Road To KNOCK OUT.1 || Shibuya, Japan || TKO (Punches) || 1 || 2:17
|-
|-  style="background:#cfc;"
| 2017-04-29 || Win ||align=left| Jinnojo || Join Forces-5 || Shinjuku, Japan || Decision (Unanimous) || 3 || 3:00
|-
|-  style="background:#fbb;"
| 2017-03-20 || Loss ||align=left| Hiiragito || M-ONE 2017 1st || Ariake, Tokyo, Japan || Decision (Split) || 3 || 3:00
|-
|-  style="background:#cfc;"
| 2017-01-22 || Win ||align=left| Tatsuya Gitteichai  || REBELS.48 & INNOVATION Champions Carnival || Tokyo, Japan || Decision (Unanimous) || 3 || 3:00
|-
|-  style="background:#cfc;"
| 2016-12-04 || Win ||align=left| Ryuto Matsumoto || BOM13-The Battle Of Muay Thai 13- || Tokyo, Japan || Decision (Unanimous) || 3 || 3:00
|-
|-  style="background:#cfc;"
| 2016-09-25 || Win ||align=left| Masa Bravely || M-ONE 2016 3rd || Ariake, Tokyo, Japan || Decision (Unanimous) || 3 || 3:00
|-
| colspan=9 | Legend:

See also
 List of male kickboxers

References

1999 births
Living people
Japanese male kickboxers
Japanese Muay Thai practitioners
Sportspeople from Tokyo